Black Pope is the nickname of the Superior General of the Society of Jesus.

Black Pope or The Black Pope may also refer to:
 Giulio Andreotti (1919–2013), Italian politician and prime minister of Italy nicknamed "The Black Pope"
 Anton LaVey (1930–1997), American author, musician, occultist, and founder of the Church of Satan labeled "The Black Pope"
 "Papa Nero" (song) or "Black Pope", a song by Pitura Freska
 Black Pope, a villain in The Order, a 2003 film
 The Black Pope, a novel by John Maddox Roberts
 The Black Pope: History of the Jesuits, a book by Margaret Anna Cusack
 Elijah Burke, American professional wrestler who used "Black Pope" as a nickname

Lists of people by nickname